The Golden Goblet Award for Best Actor (Chinese: 金爵奖最佳男演员) is a prize given to the films in the main category of Competition at the Shanghai International Film Festival.

Award Winners

References

Lists of films by award
Shanghai International Film Festival